Sagittaria australis, the Appalachian arrowhead or longbeak arrowhead, is a plant species native to much of the eastern part of the United States, from Louisiana to Iowa to New York State to Florida, mostly between New Jersey and Mississippi with scattered locations elsewhere in the range.

It is an emergent aquatic, growing in swamps and along the edges of lakes and ponds. It is sometimes sold as an ornamental to be cultivated in aquaria or garden ponds.

Sagittaria australis is a perennial herb up to 130 cm (50 inches) tall. It is unusual in genus in having a 5-winged petiole. Flowers are up to 3 cm (1.2 inches) in diameter, white, producing an achene with a recurved beak.

References

External links
US Department of Agriculture, Plants profile, Sagittaria australis (J.G. Sm.) Small, Longbeak arrowhead 
Photo of herbarium specimen at Missouri Botanical Garden, collected in Kentucky, Sagittaria australis
Photo of herbarium specimen at Missouri Botanical Garden, collected in Alabama in 1896, holotype of Sagittaria longirostra var. australis and Sagittaria australis
Missouri Botanical Garden, Gardening Tips, Sagittaria australis 'Benni' SILK STOCKINGS
Alabama Plant Atlas, Sagittaria australis
Wetland Biology, University of Georgia, Long-beak Arrowhead 
Delaware Wildflowers
Digital Atlas of the Virginia Flora

australis
Flora of the United States
Freshwater plants
Garden plants
Plants described in 1897